The Shah Ali hammam is a historical hammam in Isfahan, Iran.The hammam belongs to the Safavid era.

See also
List of the historical structures in the Isfahan province

References

Buildings and structures in Isfahan
Tourist attractions in Isfahan Province
Public baths in Iran